Semnani (سمنی زفون, Semani zefön) is one of the local languages of the Semnan Province of Iran. Despite the common misconception that Semnani is a Persian dialect, the language belongs to the Northwestern branch of the Western Iranian languages. Like other Caspian languages, it bears some resemblance to the Old Iranian Median language and was influenced by Parthian in a later process.

Phonology

Consonants

(Where symbols appear in pairs, the one to the right represents a voiced consonant. Allophones are in parentheses.)

Grammar

Syntax 
Subjects in Semnani must have gender agreement with the verb in their immediate clause.

Notes

Bibliography
Pierre Lecoq.  1989.  "Les dialectes caspiens et les dialectes du nord-ouest de l'Iran," Compendium Linguarum Iranicarum.  Ed. Rüdiger Schmitt.  Wiesbaden:  Dr. Ludwig Reichert Verlag.  Pages 296-314.

Northwestern Iranian languages
Caspian languages

th:กลุ่มภาษาเซมมานี